Simon Sues is a comic originally published by Tokyopop during their Pilot Program. The story focuses on the titular character as he battles supernatural forces using various laws of logic and psychology.  The format of each stand alone story arc is similar to that of a police procedural, with each case being won by Simon uncovering some contractual loophole.  Most of the themes of the comic are based on various detective stories such as Sherlock Holmes, as well as H. P. Lovecraft and M. R. James.

Plot summary 
Simon is a former law students at the fictional campus of Haversford.  Since leaving the university's prestigious law school for mysterious reasons, the students have been plagued with bizarre cases of both extraordinary good fortune and tragedy. With the start of a record breaking winning streak for the university's basketball team, comes several suicides and fatal accidents.  Following a grad student's ground breaking research appearing in the papers, an unexplained illness rampages through the chemistry lab. Only a few people are aware that these are the effects of students entering into contracts with demonic-like creatures called Host Fiends.  Unfortunately for the students, the contracts are worded in a way that will force them or someone they love to either break the terms, or suffer greatly. Simon returns to the school and makes it his mission to defend the students against the Fiends as well as their own misjudgments.  With him is a precocious young boy named Isaac who has the ability to banish and destroy Friends that breach their own contracts. The story gets more complicated when it is discovered that for every case Simon wins, the closer he gets to losing his soul.

Characters

Simon 
Simon was once a brilliant law student, focusing on family law.  However, following a terrifying introduction to his ward Isaac, Simon was forced to drop from the program and begin a rigorous study of demonic law.  Possessed with a fierce sense of justice, Simon can be stubborn and proud, traits that have led him to make false assumptions during cases.  Technically, It was his pride that entangled him in the terrifying world of fiends in the first place.  His relationship with Isaac is fairly complicated. On one hand he sees him as the same abused young boy he was years ago, but on the other, Simon can't help but feel bitter resentment toward Isaac for tricking him.  Despite this, he is willing to risk his own soul to save Isaac and protect his foster sister, June.  Simon was romantically involved with his professor, Winifred Adler until he broke it off for her own safety.  He runs an antique store called the Curiosity Shop, a name taken from the work of his favorite British author.  He's an avid tea drinker and is addicted to Sudoku puzzles.  He is also fairly absent minded and despises the cold and early morning.

Issac
Contrary to his appearance, Isaac's true age is well over 300 years old.  Most of that time was spent in the service of the witch hunting family, Salazar, under which he suffered extreme physical and mental abuse.  To cope with the torture, Isaac developed an interest in puzzle games and making various time pieces.  According to Isaac, the only comforting thing in his life was finding ways to keep track of time.  In that way, he could judge whether his life was worth while.  Beneath his disgruntled attitude, Isaac is terrified that Simon will renege on his word and abandon him to his fate.  He also rejects June because of the same fear, since her presence is a strong temptation for Simon to forget his current mission.  When he was younger, Isaac's brother Jon was driven crazy by lesser demons living in the nearby Catskill mountains and was eventually murdered by Salazar.

Dr. Winifred 'Fred' Adler 
She is both caring and insightful, often guiding Simon with words of wisdom.  Fred is one of the few people who know the truth about the strange happenings on campus.  She was the one who lent Simon the antique shop and brings him information about students who are suspected of making contracts.  Before Simon left law school, they had been secretly dating.  Although now Simon keeps his distance, she still has feelings for her former student and goes so far as to forbid him from winning anymore cases.  Simon asks for her advice before summoning a 7th degree trial, and eventually tells her he never wanted to leave her in the first place.

June
Her parents run a mechanic shop in the city and the family lives in an apartment above it.  When June was a 4, her parents adopted an 8 year old Simon.  June likes to tease Simon about their childhood because as a younger sister, she always looked after him.  That is why June ignored Simon when he told her not to come to the antique shop to make sure he was all right.  She has no problem yelling at him when he over analyzes the situation.  Simon himself admitted that she's the only one he can't win an argument against because he reverts to being irrational. She is at first suspicious of Isaac, but can't help pitying him after she learns he's a victim of abuse.  June becomes involved with a senior at Haversford who is discovered to be a part of secret cult/fraternity on campus.

Sarah Choi  
With her help, Simon is able to discover the perpetrators of the website "Netromancer" and temporarily disable it.  Because of her involvement, she's targeted by members of a fiend worshiping cult.  When Isaac mistakenly believes Simon is going to lose to the fiend Beylial, he tricks Sarah into making a counter offer.  Sarah loses her hearing because of this which causes Simon to expel Isaac from the Curiosity shop.

Gregori Agrossi 
The legitimate aspect of the business is selling and trading antiques to high end collectors, but by several 'clerical errors', ends up supplying Simon with many dangerous artifacts used in his practice.  After finding Simon's transaction history, Agrossi instructed a research team to find out whether Simon was conducting a 'dark' business.  Later helps Simon find the last of his binding keys.

Harvey Lumens 
He became involved when he attempted to retrieve a set of 8th century keys that were accidentally delivered to Simon years ago.  When he fails to recover the keys he tries to activate the curse that was placed on them by their original owner, a Gregorian Monk named Francisco.  He soon regrets his actions, especially when the Rune is transferred to an innocent bystander.  He later convinces the Oraculum to help research the whereabouts of the 5th binding key.

Eleanor Du L'Arc 
Unlike Harvey and Malcolm, she is not a mystic or a scholar and but a rare crusader.  She trained in an improvised version of Savate as well as fencing.  She can also use canes or staves, such as when she uses Giovanni's staff to defend him against the fiend Mephisto.

Mephisto 
His true intentions are yet unknown, however he appears as a demonic legal counterpart to Simon. Mephisto has a weak spot for any creature that displays uncommon powers of reason, since fiends are by nature, slaves to rules.  He believes that winning Simon's soul as well as invading the Haverford campus will ultimately complete his secret master plan.  On earth he is disguised as the attorney for the Salazar family.  He is also Isaac's Host Fiend.

Fiends and Case Numbers 
Fiends are the demon like creatures that reside in the deepest domain of the underworld.  They are the ruling class, but are further divided into ranks.  The four major ranks in ascending order are Groundling, Military, Knighthood, and Royalty.  Lesser beasts and demons are known to serve fiends as guardians, messengers, or slaves.  A fiend's standing is based on their strength as well as their host of souls.  The more souls a fiend gathers in its domain, the greater it becomes.  This can mean either human or animal.  But those that have strong mental or spiritual abilities are more desirable assets.  The only thing that a fiend must obey under penalty of its own destruction are the laws of demon logic that were set forth by the Infernal Creators, neutral deities that barter life energies.

Fiends can be of any form, and shape shift to disguise their true appearance, especially when dealing with humans.  They are covetous and suspicious of each other. Each case in the comic mainly deals with a single fiend whose identity needs to be uncovered.  It's revealed that when fiends come to earth, they identify with a unique element or force that they can corrupt.  It's through this connection that the fiend can be called through a degree summons.  

Simon is tasked with winning 99 games or dockets as they're referred to in each story arc (i.e. defeating Fiends at their own game) in order to win Isaac's Case.  At the start of the comic, 82 cases have already been won.

Demon Law 
In the demon world, fiends and other higher order creatures are driven by demon logic and are bound by its laws.  The only one to master Demon Logic since Simon was King Solomon of the ancient world. Solomon built many secret artifacts to help him control fiends.  For this purpose he developed the art of Degree summoning and chronicled everything in a special grimoire.  The Oraculum was founded to study his legacy and worked to uncover three of the recorded seven artifacts of Solomon.

Summoning 
Degree summons were created specifically to restrain and interrogate a demon that is connected to a mortal.  To perform a degree summons you need four things: The contract that was forged between fiend and mortal, the exact identity of the fiend, and lastly a means of controlling the fiend.  The more powerful a fiend is, the higher the degree is needed to complete the summons.  Summons range from 4th to 7th degree, 7th reserved for only the most dangerous fiends and royalty.  If the summons is performed wrong, the fiend can be set free to turn on you.  The actual summon requires chaining several incantations together using demon logic.  Isaac explained that even if you know the name of the fiend, you need to understand the fiend's nature in order to form the right paths of logic.  Almost always, Simon uses a fourth artifact, Solomon's Table, that was hidden away in a time pocket, to connect the paths.  However, it is possible to perform a summons without the table by using Infernal Constellations or Coordinates.  Simon used Coordinates while in the hospital to summon the fiend Haellock.

There are several artifacts that were created to bind a fiend once they're summoned.  Simon's keys have the power to bind specific aspects such as limbs, speech, or sight.  Agrossi uses a ring to gain  temporary control and a staff to physically beat fiend's into submission.  Both are inferior to Simon's binding keys.  Harvey alludes to a 5th binding key that can read and controls a demon's mind, but so far it hasn't been found.

Contracts 

A fiend's contract is a bargain, either written or spoken, that ties a mortal to a fiend.  The contract itself always takes on a physical form of some kind and the fiend embeds its own signature in it.  It can be anything from a mirror, to an element, and even a human like Isaac.  Once it's made, that demon becomes the mortal's Host Fiend.  This means when the contract is breached, the victim's body is devoured and becomes his soul is chained eternally to his host fiend's circle.

A fiend cannot alter the terms of their deal or fail to abide by them.  They also cannot directly influence the mortal.  That doesn't include human accomplices, like Salazaar acting for Mephisto.  If any of those laws are broken, the contract can be used to utterly destroy the fiend and its house.  Isaac can change the shape of any contract right before he's about to exorcise a fiend.  It is not clear what happens to all the souls that fiend collected.  They may get set free since Harvey joked that Simon was 'angering some landlords since only the bank collects' when Isaac exorcises a fiend.  Eleanor also commented that making a contract with a fiend doesn't make you fit for hell.  So it is possible that when souls are released, they may get reincarnated or judge by another entity.

If humans breach their contract they have a short time called their expiration before their host fiend appears to collect them.  In that time Fiends will torture their victims until they're ready to devour them.  The expiration varies and it seems like they depend on how important the soul is to the demon.  But it's usually determined when the contract is made.  During the expiration, the contract tries to destroy itself so there is no possibility to trace things back to the host fiend.  So far, the only way to affect the expiration is using a trinket like Isaac's pocket watch.  Since it originally belonged to a fiend, it might mean that only a fiend can change the time.

References

External links 
 BentoComics

Tokyopop titles